Karmi may refer to:

Karmi (beer), a Polish brand of beers
Karmi, Cyprus, a village in Cyprus
Spelling variant of Carmi (surname)